Jacques Brinkman (born 26 August 1966 in Utrecht) is a former Dutch field hockey player, who twice won the golden medal with the national squad: at the 1996 Summer Olympics in Atlanta and four years later, at the 2000 Summer Olympics in Sydney. There he played his last international tournament for the Dutch, after a career spanning more than thirteen years.

Brinkman made his debut on 1 May 1987 in a friendly match against West-Germany. As a midfielder, he played 337 international matches for Holland, in which he scored 84 goals, making him Holland's most capped player. Brinkman surpassed the previous record holder, Cees Jan Diepeveen, in 1998. He won the Hockey World Cup in 1990 and 1998, and also the annual Champions Trophy (1996, 1998 and 2000). In the Dutch League he played for Kampong, Amsterdam H&BC and Stichtse Cricket en Hockey Club. Since the summer of 2003 he has been head coach with his former club from SCHC from Bilthoven.

External links
 Dutch Hockey Federation

External links
 

1966 births
Living people
Dutch male field hockey players
Male field hockey midfielders
Dutch field hockey coaches
Olympic field hockey players of the Netherlands
Field hockey players at the 1988 Summer Olympics
Field hockey players at the 1992 Summer Olympics
Field hockey players at the 1996 Summer Olympics
1998 Men's Hockey World Cup players
Field hockey players at the 2000 Summer Olympics
Olympic gold medalists for the Netherlands
Olympic bronze medalists for the Netherlands
Olympic medalists in field hockey
Medalists at the 1988 Summer Olympics
Medalists at the 1996 Summer Olympics
Medalists at the 2000 Summer Olympics
Sportspeople from Utrecht (city)
Amsterdamsche Hockey & Bandy Club players
SCHC players
SV Kampong players
1990 Men's Hockey World Cup players
20th-century Dutch people
21st-century Dutch people